KSI (born 1993; Olajide Olayinka Williams Olatunji) is an English YouTube personality, rapper and boxer.

KSI or Ksi may also refer to:

 Killed or Seriously Injured, in road safety
Kontoret för särskild inhämtning ("Office for Special Collection"), a Swedish intelligence agency
 The Korean Studies Institute, a research institution on Korean studies in South Korea
 KSI Industries, a fictional company in Transformers: Age of Extinction
 KSI, IATA code for Kissidougou Airport in Guinea
 (Football Association of Iceland), Icelandic sports group
ksi (unit), kilopound per square inch, a non-SI unit of stress or pressure
Ksi (Cyrillic), a letter of the early Cyrillic alphabet (Ѯ, ѯ) derived from the Greek letter Xi

See also 
The Greek letter Ξ/ξ, pronounced [ksi] in Greek